The Museo Interdisciplinare Regionale (MuMe). or Regional Museum of Messina, is an art museum located on the northern coast of the city of Messina, Sicily, Italy.

MuMe illustrates the development of art and culture in Messina from the 12th to the 18th centuries, with outstanding figures such as the renowned artists Andrea della Robbia, Antonello da Messina, Girolamo Alibrandi, Caravaggio (Michelangelo Merisi), and Polidoro da Caravaggio.

Building
The building housing the museum was originally the Barbera-Mellinghoff spinning-mill, a late 19th-century construction chosen after the great earthquake of 1908 to be the site of the future museum, which was refurbished and finally opened in 1922. Over the years the building has been considerably restructured in order to guarantee the exhibits the best possible conditions for their preservation; the last major work was carried out in the 1980s. A new large complex of buildings near the present site was completed in 2010s.

Collections
The original collections came from the Museo Civico. After the earthquake in 1908 these were expanded by the addition of paintings, sculptures and precious decorative works from damaged or destroyed buildings, thus creating a collection of paintings and sculptures by internationally known and local artists, together with a variety of other objets d'art.

Exhibition
The museum was organized on historicistic principles: each area contains the most important works of the same period, regardless of their typological class.

 Rooms 1-2 works of the Norman-Swabian period
 Rooms 3-4 sculptures and paintings of the 15th and 16th century
 Room 4 "Saint Gregory Polyptych" by Antonello da Messina
 Rooms 5-8 Paintings, sculptures, funerary monuments and works of decorative art of the 16th century
 Room 6 "Scylla" by G. A. Montorsoli
 Rooms 9-11 17th-century art and culture
 Room 10 Caravaggio works 
 Room 12 18th-century art and culture in Messina
 Room 13 "The treasury" silversmithry, cribs, church ornaments, pottery

References 

Museums in Sicily